This was the first edition of the tournament.

Isak Arvidsson and Fred Simonsson won the title, defeating Markus Eriksson and Milos Sekulic 6–3, 3–6, [10–6] in the final.

Seeds

Draw

References
 Main Draw

RC Hotel Open - Doubles